The Constitutional Party was one of the Spanish political parties that contended for power during the reign of Amadeo I (reigned 1870–1873) and the First Spanish Republic (1873-1874), opposing the Radical Democratic Party.

The party was established in 1871, after the division of the Progressive Party following the death of General Juan Prim, 1st Marquis of los Castillejos. The right wing of the party, along with some members of the Liberal Union organised themselves as a party under the leadership of General Francisco Serrano, 1st Duke of la Torre and Práxedes Mateo Sagasta.

The constitutionalists split up in two groups after the 1874 restoration of the monarchy. The right faction of the party, led by Manuel Alonso Martínez, accepted the new King Alfonso XII and the new Constitution, and joined the Conservative Party of Antonio Cánovas del Castillo. The rest of the party, headed by Sagasta, remained faithful to the Constitution of 1869 until 1880, when they finally accepted the new one and the turno system, establishing the Liberal Party, which contended for power opposing the Conservative Party.

References
Historia de España, Vicens Vives, 2009, 

1871 establishments in Spain
1880 disestablishments in Spain
Liberal parties in Spain
Political parties established in 1871
Political parties disestablished in 1880
Defunct political parties in Spain
Defunct liberal political parties